Olfactory receptor 8J3 is a protein that in humans is encoded by the OR8J3 gene.

See also
 Olfactory receptor

References

Further reading

External links 
 

Olfactory receptors